This is a list of Macquarie University people.

Academia and science

Business

Government and politics

Australia
Peter Andren, Australian politician, former Member for Calare in the Australian House of Representatives
Sally McManus, Australian union leader, Secretary of the Australian Council of Trade Unions
Kerry Bartlett, Australian politician, former Member for Macquarie in the Australian House of Representatives
Meredith Burgmann, Australian politician, former President of the New South Wales Legislative Council
Victor Dominello, Australian politician, member of the New South Wales Legislative Assembly representing Ryde and NSW Cabinet minister
 Sam Dastyari, Australian politician, Senator representing New South Wales
Peter Debnam, Australian politician, former member of the New South Wales Legislative Assembly representing Vaucluse
Trish Doyle, Australian politician, member of the New South Wales Legislative Assembly for the electorate of Blue Mountains
Harry Edwards, Australian politician and economist 
John Faulkner, Australian politician, former Senator representing New South Wales
John Hewson , Australian politician and former leader of the Liberal Party of Australia
Stephen Jones, Australian politician, Member for Throsby in the Australian House of Representatives
Mike Kelly , Australian politician, former member for Eden Monaro in the Australian House of Representatives
David Leyonhjelm, Australian politician, Senator representing New South Wales
Jann McFarlane, Australian politician, former Member for Stirling in the Australian House of Representatives
Tania Mihailuk, Australian politician, member of the New South Wales Legislative Assembly representing Bankstown
Rev. Fred Nile, Australian politician, member of the New South Wales Legislative Council
Rob Oakeshott, Australian politician, former Member for Lyne in the Australian House of Representatives
Jamie Parker, Australian politician, member of the New South Wales Legislative Assembly representing Balmain
Tanya Plibersek, Australian politician, Member for Sydney in the Australian House of Representatives
Steven Pringle, former member of the New South Wales Legislative Assembly
Eric Roozendaal, Australian politician, former Member of the New South Wales Legislative Council
Janelle Saffin, Australian politician, Member for Page in the Australian House of Representatives
Carl Scully, Australian politician, former member of the New South Wales Legislative Assembly representing Smithfield
Helen Sham-Ho , Australian politician, former Member of the New South Wales Legislative Council
Lisa Singh, Australian politician, Senator representing Tasmania
 Jim Soorley, Australian politician, former Lord Mayor of Brisbane
Karin Sowada, Australian politician, former Senator representing New South Wales
Rob Stokes, Australian politician, member of the New South Wales Legislative Assembly, Minister for Planning (New South Wales)

International

Other
Peter Anderson, Australian former police minister and former Director of the Centre for Policing
John Avery, Australian Chief Commissioner of the New South Wales Police Force
Alison Broinowski, Australian academic, journalist, writer and former Australian public servant
John Connor, Australian chief executive of Climate Institute of Australia
Kathryn Greiner, Australian politician, alderman of the City of Sydney
Frank Howarth, Australian public servant and was the Director of the Australian Museum
Greg Lindsay, Australian founder and executive director of the Centre for Independent Studies
Judy Mundey, Australian feminist and activist
Cameron Murphy , Australian civil libertarian
Christine Nixon, Australian former Chief Commissioner of Victoria Police and Chair, Monash College and Deputy Chancellor, Monash University
Kathryn Paterson, Australian New Zealand public servant
Andrew Scipione, Australian Chief Commissioner of the New South Wales Police Force
Patricia Scott, Australian public servant
Jeannette Young, Australian medical doctor and Chief Health Officer of Queensland

Arts

Thea Astley , Australian writer, four time Miles Franklin Award winner
Boey Kim Cheng, Singapore-born Australian poet
Timothy Hawkes , Australian educator and writer, headmaster of The King's School, Parramatta
Paul Kraus, Australian writer
Jeni Mawter, Australian writer
Liane Moriarty, Australian writer
Şahînê Bekirê Soreklî, Kurdish writer
Kimberley Starr, Australian writer
Les Wicks, Australian poet

Media

Jane Caro, Australian writer
Anja Coleby, Australian model, television actress, television producer
Miranda Devine, Australian journalist
Michael Duffy, Australian journalist, writer, radio presenter
Martin Flood, Australian quiz show contestant, top prize winner on Australia's Who Wants to Be a Millionaire?
Kate Forsyth, Australian writer and journalist
Brad Jakeman, Marketing executive 
Hugh Mackay , Australian journalist, novelist, psychologist and sociologist
Robert Ovadia, Australian journalist and television presenter
Peter Overton, Australian journalist and television presenter
Hugh Riminton, Australian journalist and television presenter
Magdalena Roze, Australian meteorologist and television presenter
Keith Windschuttle, Australian historian and writer, editor of Quadrant
Irfan Yusuf, Australian social commentator and writer

Law

Lloyd Babb , Australian barrister and NSW Director of Public Prosecutions
Jayne Jagot, Australian judge, Judge of the Federal Court of Australia
Lindy Jenkins, Australian judge, Justice of the Supreme Court of Western Australia
Brian Preston , Australian judge, Chief Justice of the Land and Environment Court of New South Wales

Religion
Paul Barnett, Australian Anglican bishop, historian and biblical scholar
Tony Nichols, Australian Anglican bishop
Graham Joseph Hill, academic at the University of Divinity

Sport

 Grant Brits, Australian swimmer
Christine Jensen Burke, Australian-New Zealand mountain climber
 Liz Ellis, Australian netball player, former captain Australian netball team
Patrik Hefti, Liechtenstein association football player
Lauren Jackson, Australian basketball player
Holly Lincoln-Smith, Australian water polo player
 Joel Milburn, Australian athlete
 Ian Thorpe, Australian swimmer (attended)
 Melissa Wu, Australian Diver
 Tom Trbojevic, Rugby league player who's currently playing for Manly Sea Eagles

Administration

Chancellor

Deputy Chancellor

Vice-Chancellors

Other faculty

Notable past and current faculty members include:

B. K. Misra - Neurosurgeon
Wally Abraham, Australian architect and town planner
 Deidre Anderson, Australian sports psychologist and Deputy Vice-Chancellor
Joan Beck, Egyptian archaeology, Honorary Fellow of Macquarie University
David Christian, British-American historian
Max Coltheart , Australian cognitive scientist and academic at Macquarie University
Raewyn Connell, Australian sociologist
Stephen Crain, American-Australian linguist
Paul Davies, British physicist, writer and broadcaster
Patrick De Deckker (de), Australian paleontologist
William Dumbrell, Australian biblical scholar
Tim Flannery, Australian mammalogist, palaeontologist, environmentalist and global warming activist
Jacqueline Jarrett Goodnow, Australian cognitive psychologist
Anita Heiss, Australian writer, presenter and commentator
Ann Henderson-Sellers, Australian climatologist
Ian Hogbin, British-born Australian anthropologist
Bryan Horrigan, Australian legal academic
 Geoffrey Hull, Australian linguist
Sohail Inayatullah, Pakistani-Australian futurologist
Naguib Kanawati, Egyptian-Australian Egyptologist
Daniel Kane, Australian linguist
 Konrad Kwiet, German Australian historian
Marion Maddox, Australian writer, academic and political commentator
Richard Makinson, Australian physicist
Gabriele Marranci, Italian anthropologist
John Mathews, Australian competitive dynamics and global strategist
Christian Matthiessen, Swedish linguist
Pat Michie, Australian neuroscientist/psychologist and academic at Newcastle University
Michael Morgan , Australian neurosurgeon
José Enrique Moyal, Israeli-Australian mathematician
Alanna Nobbs, Australian historian and writer
Marlene Norst, Austrian Australian linguist
Boyo Ockinga, Australian Egyptologist, epigrapher, and philologist
Suzanne O'Reilly, Australian geologist
Brian Orr, Australian physicist
Pam Peters, Australian linguist 
Josef Pieprzyk, Polish-Australian cryptologist
Ingrid Piller, Australian linguist
Jim Piper , New Zealand-Australian physicist
Andrew Pitman, British atmospheric scientist
Arthur William Pryor, Australian physicist
Murry Salby, American atmospheric scientist
Leonie Sandercock, Canadian Australian urban theorist
Patricia Margaret Selkirk, Australian biologist
David Skellern , Australian electronic engineer and computer scientist
Christina Slade, Australian academic and vice-chancellor of Bath Spa University
Ross Street, Australian mathematician and Fellow of the Australian Mathematical Society
Keith Suter, Australian social scientist
Esther Szekeres, Hungarian–Australian mathematician
David Throsby , Australian economist
Andrew Tink , Australian former politician, writer and legal academic
Alfred van der Poorten, Dutch Australian mathematician and Fellow of the Australian Mathematical Society
John Veevers, Australian geologist
Neil Weste, Australian inventor and engineer
Clive Williams, British Australian political scientist

References

Macquarie University
 
University